Always a Bride may refer to:
 Always a Bride (1940 film), an American comedy film
 Always a Bride (1953 film), a British comedy film

See also
 Always a Bridesmaid (disambiguation)